Predikant is a minister in the Dutch Reformed Church in South Africa. Predikant is the Afrikaans term for "pastor".

The word 'predikant' is also used in the Dutch, West Frisian, Norwegian and Swedish languages.

References 

Afrikaans words and phrases
South African English
Christian religious occupations
Ecclesiastical titles